Kano is a fictional character in the Mortal Kombat fighting game franchise by Midway Games and NetherRealm Studios. Debuting in the original 1992 game, he is the leader of the Black Dragon, a fictional criminal organization. Kano is distinguished by his cybernetic eye, which he has used as a laser in later installments. As one of the series' recurring villains, he often aligns himself with the forces threatening Earthrealm. He is also the archenemy of Special Forces officer Sonya Blade, who seeks to bring him to justice.

The character has appeared in various media outside of the games, including the 1995 film adaptation and the 2021 film. Reception to the character has been mainly positive; his heart rip Fatality in the first game is regarded as one of the franchise's most iconic.

Appearances

Mortal Kombat games
First depicted in the Mortal Kombat canon as a Japanese-American who was orphaned at a young age and fell into a life of crime, Kano is the leader of the Black Dragon criminal empire, having been deported from both Japan and the United States, and becoming a wanted man in thirty-five other countries. Initially named Kao, his eye plate came from a gunshot by escaping Sonya Blade in a scrapped Special Forces game. He made his first chronological appearance in the 2000 platform game Mortal Kombat: Special Forces, freeing fellow Black Dragon cohorts No Face, Tasia, Jarek, and Tremor from a Special Forces security facility under the pretense that they would reform the organization, though he really intended to use them as pawns to slow down any Special Forces agents who might pursue him. They kill an entire Special Forces unit during the prison break before Kano heads to Outworld, where he recovers the Eye of Chitian, an artifact through which he would acquire incredible power. While Special Forces Major Jackson "Jax" Briggs gets ahold of the object first and transports himself and Kano back to Earthrealm, the latter soon escapes custody.

Kano enters the Mortal Kombat tournament in the original Mortal Kombat (1992) after hearing rumors that tournament host Shang Tsung's palace was filled with gold and other riches, with the intention of looting it for the Black Dragon. However, he is fervently pursued by U.S. Special Forces officer Sonya Blade, who holds a personal grudge against Kano that was left unspecified in the game's storyline. He evades capture by leaping onto Shang Tsung's junk bound for the tournament. When Sonya tracks him onto the private island, she is captured and forced to compete. She and Kano are among the competition's few survivors, and during the final battle between Shang Tsung and Shaolin monk Liu Kang, Sonya reluctantly teams up with Kano to fight off the Shokan Prince Goro. During their battle, the island immediately self-destructs following Shang Tsung's defeat, trapping Kano and Sonya in the otherworldly dimension Outworld. They are both captured and spend the events of Mortal Kombat II (1993) chained and on display in Outworld emperor Shao Kahn's arena.

In Mortal Kombat 3 (1995), Jax finds and rescues Sonya and Kano, enabling him to escape their clutches once again. Kano convinces Shao Kahn to spare his soul at the outset of the tyrant's invasion of Earth on the grounds that he can teach his armies how to use Earthrealm weaponry. While Sonya tosses Kano to his apparent death from the roof of a high-rise, he survives and is found by the centaur Motaro, who heals and imprisons him. Motaro is killed by the warrior Sheeva, who frees Kano from his prison. During the events of Mortal Kombat: Deadly Alliance (2002), he and Sheeva originally hatched a plan to assassinate Shao Kahn, but Kano turns on her by preventing the attack. As a reward, he is promoted to general of Outworld's rapidly shrinking army before the invasion is defeated. Even in the face of overwhelming odds, Kano stood his ground and eventually manages to repel Princess Kitana and her Edenian-Shokan army. He returns to Shao Kahn's palace just as the Deadly Alliance, Shang Tsung and Quan Chi, launch their attack on the weakened emperor. After the battle, Kano declares his allegiance to the Deadly Alliance. The two have Kano oversee the enslavement of a small village, who construct a temple over Onaga's tomb to house a Soulnado. During its construction, Kano is assaulted by Li Mei, but Quan Chi intervenes, as the Alliance had made a deal with the Red Dragon leader Mavado to eliminate the swordsman Kenshi in exchange for the opportunity to fight and defeat Kano.

Kano returns in Mortal Kombat: Armageddon (2006), in which the demigod Taven finds him being held prisoner by the Red Dragon Clan. Before escaping their facilities, Kano explains to Taven that the Red Dragon had been experimenting on him and their clansmen in an effort to create genetically engineered dragons and human-dragon hybrids.

Kano appears as one of eleven Mortal Kombat characters representing the franchise in the non-canonical crossover fighting game Mortal Kombat vs. DC Universe (2008).

In the 2011 Mortal Kombat reboot, which retells the stories of the first three games, Kano is the Black Dragon's leader who tricked the Special Forces by acting as an informant and deliberately feeding them false intelligence that led to the deaths of many of Sonya and Jax's comrades, establishing their vendetta against him. During the events of the first Shaolin tournament, Kano fights Sonya following her fight with the pompous actor Johnny Cage, but he is defeated. While Kano is later beaten by Sonya again after Shang Tsung presents him to her as a challenge, the tournament host forbids her from arresting him. Following this, Kano becomes Shao Kahn's arms supplier, giving his armies Earthrealm weaponry for his impending invasion. After Kabal, a former Black Dragon member turned SWAT officer, is severely burned by the warrior Kintaro, Kano takes him away to restore his health alongside Shang Tsung and outfit him with a respirator, mask, and hookswords even in spite of his former ally's defection. However, Kabal is mortified by his condition and furious at Kano for siding against Earthrealm, so he bests him in combat and forces him to take him to Shao Kahn before knocking Kano out. Kano later joins Goro and Kintaro in holding a group of soldiers hostage before being frozen by the cyborg Sub-Zero. However, Kano manages to free himself and informs his ally Noob Saibot that Sub-Zero broke free of his controller, Sektor.

Kano returned for the series' tenth installment, Mortal Kombat X (2015). His confirmation for the game was leaked by the German version of GamePro, before his appearance was officially announced. He first appears in a comic book prequel, set after Quan Chi launched his own invasion of Earthrealm. Kano joins Sub-Zero in infiltrating a Red Dragon base to retrieve a Kamidogu dagger, though the former sought to take it for himself. Once Sub-Zero finds the dagger, Kano steals it and injures Sub-Zero with it, unaware it contained a demon. The dagger possesses Sub-Zero and quickly injures Kano, leaving him to fall back as Sub-Zero escapes. Kano is later hired by Kotal alongside the gunman Erron Black to capture Sonya and Jax's respective daughters, Cassie Cage and Jacqui Briggs. While they were successful, he and his fellow Black Dragons are ambushed by Mavado and the Red Dragon. Kano escapes after being injured in the fight, leaving Black for dead. Sometime after the comic book, and during the main game, Kano infiltrates the Shaolin Temple and steals the fallen Elder God Shinnok's amulet for Shao Kahn's daughter, Mileena, to assist in a civil war against Outworld's new ruler, Kotal Kahn. He attempts to distract the new Kahn while Mileena sets up an ambush, but Kotal realizes Kano is going to betray him and defeats the criminal. After he defeats Mileena, Kano retreats to Earthrealm. He infiltrates an Outworld refugee camp, but is caught by Kenshi and Sonya, who take him into custody.

As of Mortal Kombat 11 (2019), Kano escaped and aligned himself with the keeper of time Kronika. To assist her further by fixing and mass-producing Sektor, she also brought in a younger version of him. Together, the two Kanos attack the Special Forces base and kidnap younger versions of Johnny and Sonya to force them to fight for the Black Dragon's entertainment before Cassie rescues them. Amidst a stand-off, Sonya kills the younger Kano, erasing the present version from existence.

Other games
He appears in the iOS game Batman: Arkham City Lockdown as an Easter egg fighting Batman in one of the levels. In the indie game Punch Club, a fighter named Jax, who is designed after the Mortal Kombat 3 incarnation of Kano, makes an appearance in one of the game's gang turf war segments.

Character design

Kano was the final fighter to be added to the first game, where his role was to serve as the enemy of the female character Sonya. Kano originally had a large helmet with two red eyes, a concept that was dropped in favor of a smaller metal piece over his right eye. The eye piece was at first envisioned as a simple eyepatch, but then it was turned into a metal plate inspired by Arnold Schwarzenegger's character in The Terminator. In his Mortal Kombat: Deception biography card, Mortal Kombat co-creator Ed Boon described how Kano's bionic eye in the first game was created by cutting out a piece of a plastic mask and painting it a silver color, then attaching it with spirit gum to actor Richard Divizio's face, with the infrared eye added digitally. For the first game he wore a simple gray tunic that was changed to red and black for MK3; Divizio said, "I thought, 'Good, get rid of that white karate outfit!'" and remarked that his versus-screen pose in the game represented his "mean Kano face". Kano's iconic heart-ripping finishing move was Divizio's idea inspired by the film Indiana Jones and the Temple of Doom on which he insisted as a fan of Indiana Jones.

Kano's MK1 costume was revived as his alternate design for Deadly Alliance and Armageddon, and his main costume in both titles has him shirtless with a black vest, while he wears a cord around his neck that has a tuft of Sonya's hair attached. His other constant in his series appearances, besides his eye, has been a bandolier worn across his chest that features a large glowing red implement; it has never served any purpose in the games, though it flashes a different color for each of his three gameplay variations for Mortal Kombat X. For an intended series reboot tentatively titled Mortal Kombat 8, former Midway Games concept artist Vincent Proce "dramatically revamped" Kano from a Black Dragon criminal into a "half Japanese, half U.S. military badass", complete with a more detailed faceplate and a simple white gi and red sash, while he went barefoot with his ankles heavily taped. The reboot was canceled with Mortal Kombat vs. DC Universe developed in its stead, and Kano was included in the game with his Black Dragon origins left intact.

In all Mortal Kombat media from the first game to Armageddon, Kano had either had a receding hairline or been completely bald (since Divizio had been going bald himself while filming for the first game and had shaved his head prior to shooting MK3) and his facial hair had regularly consisted of nothing more than stubble. With MKvsDC and the 2011 reboot, Kano was given a full head of hair and beard, and a cosmetic addition in the reboot was two large solid-black dragon tattoos that started at his chest and snaked around his arms, while his outfits in both games were throwbacks to the two-dimensional titles. The character was originally depicted as an expediate American, until his nationality was retconned as Australian after English actor Trevor Goddard portrayed him in the first Mortal Kombat film.

Gameplay
In the original Mortal Kombat, Kano's special moves were the Knife Throw, making him one of two characters in the game (besides Scorpion) whose projectile was a physical weapon, while his body-propel move, the Cannonball, saw him curl into a ball and launch himself at his opponent. Sega Visions called the Knife Throw "a strong distance weapon and easily thrown". Kano also possessed one of the more graphic Fatalities in the game, which involved him plunging his hand into his opponent's chest and ripping out their still-beating heart. In the censored SNES version, he instead fractures the opponent's sternum with a deadly punch. Boon claimed that Sub-Zero's "Spine Rip" Fatality from the same game stood out more, because Kano's finisher did not have a "mark left on the opponent's body". Kano was cut from the Game Gear version of Mortal Kombat due to memory constraints, while a still image of him wielding an automatic weapon in his arcade ending was removed from the Genesis version of the game.

Kano was not playable in Mortal Kombat II; according to series co-creator John Tobias in a 1994 interview with GamePro, in the first game, "Kano and Sonya were probably picked the least. We [Midway] still wanted to include them in the storyline, so we had them captured." He then confirmed that Kano and Sonya would return in a future installment. Indeed, Kano and Sonya were playable in Mortal Kombat 3, where his moves from the first game were retained while he gained a new "Choke" maneuver where he lifted his opponents and then violently shook them. His Fatalities were far less graphic than in the first game, as he either exploded his opponent with a laser blast from his implant, or reached down their throat to pull out their entire skeleton and hold it aloft without any blood or gore present. The game featured the unplayable hidden character Noob Saibot, who was a silhouetted sprite of Kano before being switched to a traditional ninja palette swap in Ultimate Mortal Kombat 3 and the 1996 compilation title Mortal Kombat Trilogy, the latter of which featured the original MK1 Kano as a selectable along with the then-current version.

Kano was the only one of the original seven characters who was omitted from Mortal Kombat 4 (1997), with new character Jarek debuting in his place. His role in the game was as the last surviving member of the Black Dragon following Kano's apparent death, and was being pursued by Sonya and Jax for "crimes against humanity". Jarek copied Kano's special moves as well as his "Heart Rip" and "Eye Laser" Fatalities despite possessing no cybernetic enhancements. He was not as well-received as his predecessor, and has not featured as a playable in the series again with the exception of Armageddon.

His eye laser is available as a special move in Deadly Alliance, and he had a special with his knives called "Ear to Ear". This was a reference to a scene in the 1995 movie in which Kano tells Sonya that he had used his knife to slit her partner's throat "from ear to ear". One of his fighting styles in the game, ironically, is aikido, which is a defensive martial art that protects the attacker from injury. He was not included in Mortal Kombat: Deception, in which Kabal takes over as the new leader of the Black Dragon after reforming it with new characters Kobra and Kira as they feud with rival faction, the Red Dragon, but returned in Armageddon.

According to Prima Games' official guide for the 2011 reboot game, Kano's "'flinch and you will be comboed' style can be frustrating to play against, but if you are a die-hard Kano user back from the Ultimate Mortal Kombat 3 days, you will find that Kano completely fits your style". The guide also determined him to not be overly formidable nor at a great disadvantage in matches against the other characters. In Mortal Kombat X, as with all playable characters, Kano has three distinctive gameplay variations.

Other media
In Malibu Comics' Mortal Kombat series, Kano appeared with all of the characters from the first game (minus Reptile) in the 1994 "Blood & Thunder" miniseries, the first issue of which borrowed liberally from John Tobias' MK comic in detailing his evading of Sonya and the Special Forces and getting into an altercation with Johnny Cage onboard Shang Tsung's ship before Cage knocks him out. In the second issue, during one of only two organized tournament fights that commenced in the entire Malibu run, Kano kills Lance, Sonya's cybernetically armed partner who had accompanied her onto the island, by way of his "Heart Rip" Fatality. He later breaks into Shang Tsung's quarters and steals his mythical tome, the Tao te Zhan, which he manages to hide on his person just before he is caught by Goro and imprisoned in a dungeon with the rest of the series characters. They all are pummeled by Goro in the following issue until Raiden comes to their rescue and breaks them out of the dungeon, but they wind up scattered throughout Outworld, and as a consequence, Kano is joined by Liu Kang, and their personalities clash from the start. Kano is still in possession of the book until it is taken by Scorpion; anxious to get it back, Kano attempts to ditch Liu Kang by scheming with a group of Outworld mutants into fighting them as a distraction, enabling him to stab his knife into Liu Kang's back and leave him for dead. In the sixth issue, he defeats Sub-Zero but is then beaten in battle by Sonya. The storyline ends with the Earth warriors victorious over the Outworlders and Kano taken into custody by Sonya and Jax, but he escapes, as detailed in a mini-story titled "Breakout" that was included in the first installment of the 1995 two-issue miniseries U.S. Special Forces, in which Kano was not featured, as the main villain therein was an original Black Dragon character named Rojack. That same year, Kano was also featured in a three-issue miniseries titled Rayden & Kano, in which Raiden presents Kano with a magical sword called "Ebbonrule", in hopes that he would kill Shao Kahn with it in the name of personal redemption, but the opposite occurs as Kano gives the sword to Kahn instead in exchange for godlike powers.

Kano was a featured character in the 1995 noncanonical Mortal Kombat novel written by Jeff Rovin, which is set before the events of the first game. He and several Black Dragon members (all originals exclusive to the book) are hired by Shang Tsung to locate a mystical amulet hidden somewhere in China. They come across a remote village in which Kung Lao resides, and Kano forces Kung Lao to accompany him on the journey. Unbeknownst to him, one of the Dragons is Sonya working undercover, as she has a personal interest in apprehending him after he had killed her fiancé several years earlier. However, Shang Tsung, Goro and Raiden interrupt the search, and Kano's Black Dragon cohorts are killed while Shang Tsung merges Kano with Kung Lao and sends the combined being to locate the amulet. After he and Kung Lao are returned to normal, Kano takes the amulet to Shang Tsung's palace, though he is assaulted by Goro after making physical contact with Shang Tsung. He then brawls with Sonya near the conclusion but the fight is inconclusive when he flees after she is momentarily distracted, thereby evading capture.

In the 1995 Mortal Kombat movie, Kano was played by English actor Trevor Goddard. The film expanded upon Kano's rivalry with Sonya from the games; she now sought vengeance against Kano for killing her (unnamed) partner. Shang Tsung hires Kano to lure Sonya into the Mortal Kombat tournament, promising to reward Kano's efforts after he presumably defeats Sonya, while demanding that she is "not to be harmed, only humiliated". Kano baits Sonya into boarding Shang Tsung's ship, and is later spotted by Cage, Sonya and Liu Kang conversing with Goro. When Sonya and Kano meet in battle, his earlier plan with Shang Tsung goes astray when he is defeated, and Shang Tsung goads Sonya into finishing him; she complies by breaking his neck. Kano is described as wearing a business suit during the dining scene in the movie novelization, which also features a detailed opening scene of an unsuccessful joint mission of arresting Black Dragon members by the Special Forces and an international task force, which culminates in Kano killing the task force's lieutenant, who is designated therein as Sonya's murdered partner. Kano is spared by Sonya in their fight, as she refuses to fall prey to Shang Tsung's scheme while declaring that nobody "owned" her, and at the end of the book, he is captured and handcuffed by Sonya. Kano's wardrobe is minimalist in the film, as his game design was eschewed in favor of the character going shirtless with a simple brown vest, while he wears only a pair of pinstriped slacks, a metal choker and combat boots when he fights Sonya. The companion book published by Prima Lifestyles prior to the film's release said in his character profile: "A strapping Australian talented in all forms of martial arts, he's particularly skilled with a knife. He seems to enjoy his cat-and-mouse game with Sonya, which began after he murdered her partner."

Kano was a main character in Mortal Kombat: Live Tour, and was portrayed by martial artists Joseph "Eddie" Acavedo and Mark Chemeleski.

The character appeared twice in the animated series Mortal Kombat: Defenders of the Realm, and was voiced by Michael Des Barres. In the sixth episode ("Familiar Red"), he works with Shao Kahn in fooling the Earthrealm defenders into chasing phony dimensional rips across the globe, while a flashback scene (shown from Sonya's perspective and narrated by Jax) depicting Kano's offscreen killing of Sonya's Special Forces partner Wexler prior to the first tournament was shown; this segment included a continuity violation as Kano was shown with his MK3 design. He confronts Kabal for the first time in the eleventh episode ("Amends") since Kabal's defection from the Black Dragon and his turn to the side of good, and his consequential disfigurement at the hands of Kahn's forces. Kano's Black Dragon comrades received a generic design of shaved heads and facial tattoos, and were operating an underground generator used for opening portals. They are easily disposed of by the Earth warriors at the conclusion and Kabal detonates the machine with a bomb, but Kano manages to escape.

English actor and martial artist Darren Shahlavi portrayed Kano in three episodes of the 2011 first season of director Kevin Tancharoen's Mortal Kombat: Legacy web series. He and the Black Dragon are shipping stolen robotics to an undisclosed location under the name "Cyber Initiative", and Kano takes Sonya hostage after she is caught infiltrating the large warehouse where the Dragons carry out their operations, and plans to kill her when the facility is raided by a SWAT team led by Jax and Stryker. During the assault, Kano engages Jax in combat but is defeated, taking a vicious punch to the temple from Jax in the process that dislodges his eye. He is later recovered by his henchmen and has his cybernetic eye surgically attached. Kano makes one last appearance in the ninth episode, which precedes the aforementioned events; the receiver of the robotics from the Black Dragon in the first episode was revealed to be the Lin Kuei headquarters.

English actor Robin Atkin Downes voices Kano in the 2020 animated film Mortal Kombat Legends: Scorpion's Revenge. Australian actor David Wenham voices Kano in the 2022 animated film Mortal Kombat Legends: Snow Blind.

Australian actor Josh Lawson portrays Kano in the 2021 reboot film Mortal Kombat.

Merchandise and promotion
Along with the original series characters, Kano was highlighted on an individual track from The Immortals' 1994 album Mortal Kombat: The Album. Titled "Use Your Might", it features a female vocalist singing the character's praises from a first-person perspective, citing him as "the strongest of them all" out of the other Mortal Kombat contestants.

Hasbro released a 4" Kano action figure in 1994, packaged with a "Kombat Cycle" vehicle. Jazwares released a Kano action figure that was part of their 2006 Shaolin Monks toyline (despite the figure sporting Kano's costume from Deadly Alliance), in addition to a 6" twentieth-anniversary Kano figure in 2012. Kano was one of twenty MK characters featured on 2.5" x 3.5" collectible magnets released by Ata-Boy Wholesale in 2011, and licensed replicas of his "Raptor" knife from the first film, which was designed by Gil Hibben, were made available for purchase.

Kano makes a brief appearance in the 2012 animated film Wreck-It Ralph, voiced by Brian Kesinger. He performs the "Heart Rip" on House of the Dead zombie character Cyril while attending a "Bad-Anon" support group that featured villains from various classic video games. He is credited as Cyborg possibly since Mortal Kombat is an M-Rated franchise. The same goes with Cyril where he is credited as Zombie rather than Cyril.

Reception
Kano placed 24th in UGO.com's 2012 selection of the series' top fifty characters, and the site had additionally ranked him in 2011 as the seventh best cyborg character of all time, ahead of RoboCop and Star Trek character Seven of Nine. Den of Geek placed him seventeenth in their 2015 ranking of the series' characters, commenting that "Kano is a special kind of scum, and the series is better for him existing ... [but] he probably wouldn’t rank quite as high if not for Trevor Goddard’s rocking performance in the first movie." Josh Wirtanen of Cheat Code Central listed Kano as the fifth best Mortal Kombat character while Game Revolution's Anthony Severino included in his 2011 "Top 10 Old School Mortal Kombat Characters" feature. Saldana praised the character as "such a scene-stealer in the movie that the MK team retconned everything about Kano to fit that portrayal", but Chris Buffa of Modojo.com included Kano in his "worst list" of characters from MK3 without explanation.

Finishing moves
Kano's Fatalities are often well-received, although his toned-down finishers in the censored SNES version of the first game and the T-rated Mortal Kombat vs. DC Universe are regarded among the worst. Russell Frushtick of UGO Networks rated the "Heart Rip" from the original Mortal Kombat second in his 2011 listing of the "Top 11 Mortal Kombat Fatalities", crediting it as singlehandedly "herald[ing] the birth of anti-video game violence advocates" and describing it as "ripping the beating heart out of an opponent's chest like he's some sort of Mola Ram". Prima Games ranked it runner-up to Sub-Zero's "Spine Rip" in their 2014 selection of the series' top Fatalities. GamePro in 2008 rated the doctored version of the finisher from the SNES port, in which Kano instead smashes the opponent's rib cage with a deadly punch, first in their list of the series' twelve "lamest" Fatalities. Craig Skistimas of ScrewAttack ranked his "Skeleton Removal" from Mortal Kombat 3 sixth on the site's "Top 10 Mortal Kombat Fatalities", but Dan Ryckert of Game Informer included it among the most confusing MK finishers. Kano's "Stomach Pounce" Fatality from Mortal Kombat vs. DC Universe has been particularly criticized for its tameness in a Mortal Kombat title negatively received for its toned-down violence. It led to his second appearance on GamePro's "Top 12 Lamest Fatalities" listing (fifth), with the magazine commenting that "absolutely no effort was put in [by the developers in] creating it." Game Informer rated it among the series' worst finishers, and Game Rant chose it as the series' worst Fatality, adding that it had no connection to the character. David Saldana of 1UP.com listed it among his selection of the MK series' worst Fatalities (seventh). ScrewAttack used the "Stomach Pounce" as the representative of all of MKvsDC's finishers topping its 2011 list of the series' worst Fatalities.

We Got this Covered rated his "Heart Transplant" Fatality from the 2011 Mortal Kombat reboot — in which Kano barehandedly decapitates his opponent and then rips out their heart before shoving their head into their chest cavity — among the series' top finishers, and Tony Searle of WhatCulture ranked it 18th in his 2014 list of the series' "20 Horrifically Stomach-Churning Fatalities."

Notes

References

Action film characters
Cyborg characters in video games
Fictional Australian people in video games
Fictional martial artists in video games
Fictional Xing Yi Quan practitioners
Fictional aikidoka
Fictional assassins in video games
Fictional blade and dart throwers
Fictional characters missing an eye
Fictional criminals in video games
Fictional eskrimadors
Fictional knife-fighters
Fictional mercenaries in video games
Male characters in video games
Male film villains
Male video game villains
Mortal Kombat characters
Video game antagonists
Video game bosses
Video game characters introduced in 1992